Braselton is a town in Barrow, Gwinnett, Hall, and Jackson counties in the U.S. state of Georgia, approximately  northeast of Atlanta. As of the 2010 census, the town had a population of 7,511, and in 2018 the estimated population was 11,652.

The Gwinnett and Barrow County portions of Braselton are part of the Atlanta–Sandy Springs–Marietta, GA, Metropolitan Statistical Area, and the Hall County portion is part of both the Atlanta and Gainesville, GA Metropolitan Statistical Areas. The remaining Jackson County portion of Braselton is not part of any core based statistical area.

History
The first permanent settlement at Braselton was made in 1884. The town is named after Harrison Braselton, a poor dirt farmer who married Susan Hosch, the daughter of a rich plantation owner. The land he purchased was later called Braselton. The Georgia General Assembly incorporated Braselton as a town in 1916.

In 1989 actress and Georgia native Kim Basinger and other investors bought  of the town's 2,000 privately owned acres for $20 million from Braselton Brothers Inc, intending to turn it into a tourist destination. Five years later, facing personal bankruptcy, she and her partners sold the land for $1 million.

Geography
Braselton is located at  (34.109167, -83.762778).

Braselton borders the mailing addresses (not city limits) of Gainesville (Candler), Flowery Branch, Oakwood (Chestnut Mountain side), and Pendergrass.

The town borders the city limits and shares a ZIP code with Hoschton.

The Road Atlanta race track has a Braselton address, but is located just north of the town itself.

Demographics

2020 census

As of the 2020 United States census, there were 13,403 people, 3,779 households, and 3,100 families residing in the town.

2018
As of the census of 2018, 11,452 people and 2,833 households resided in the town. The racial makeup of the town was 77% White, 12% Black, 2% Asian, 0% from other races, and 4% from two or more races. Hispanics or Latinos of any race were 5% of the population.

Of the 2,833 households, 29% had children under the age of 18 living with them, 68.6% were married couples living together, 12.0% had a female householder with no husband present, and 21.4% were not families. About 18.3% of all households were made up of individuals, and 7.3% had someone living alone who was 65 years of age or older.  The average household size was 3.60 and the average family size was 3.16.

In the town, the population was distributed as 29% under the age of 18, 8% from 18 to 24, 10% from 25 to 34, 15% from 35 to 44, 16% from 45-54, 10% from 55-64 and 14% who were  years of age or older.  The median age was 40 years. For every 100 females, there were 98.7 males.  For every 100 females age 18 and over, there were 90.6 males.

The median income for a household in the town is $105,096 and for a family was $49,327. The median value for a housing unit was $318,700. Males had a median income of $46,477 versus $27,292 for females. The per capita income for the town was $35,921.  About 4.1% of families and 3.9% of the population were below the poverty line, including 6.9% of those under age 18 and 12.6% of those age 65 or over.

Infrastructure
The town operates a police department, a Hall County Sheriff's Office location, post office, and one fire station. Northeast Georgia Health System built a new hospital in the Central/ Greater Braselton area that opened in Spring 2015. It's the first net-new hospital in Georgia in 20 years.

References

External links

 Town of Braselton official website
 The Braselton Family historical marker
 The Braselton School Bell historical marker

Towns in Barrow County, Georgia
Towns in Hall County, Georgia
Towns in Jackson County, Georgia
Towns in Gwinnett County, Georgia
Towns in Georgia (U.S. state)
Populated places established in 1884
1884 establishments in Georgia (U.S. state)